Kaki no tane or Kaki-pi are a common snack in Japan. They are often consumed with beer and are sometimes a bar snack. Kaki-pi has several different types of flavors, such as wasabi, pepper, amongst others. In 2017 the food was officially certified "Space Japanese Food" by the JAXA.

See also
Japanese peanut

References

Beika
Japanese snack food